The 2020–21 Brooklyn Nets season was the 45th season of the franchise in the National Basketball Association (NBA), 54th season overall, and its ninth season playing in the New York City borough of Brooklyn. On September 3, 2020, the Nets hired Steve Nash as their new head coach.

The Nets set a franchise record for three-point field goals during the game versus the Sacramento Kings on February 15, 2021, with 27 three-point field goals, and narrowly missed the NBA record (29), which was set by the Milwaukee Bucks on December 29, 2020.

Fan attendance in home games was prohibited until February 23, 2021, per an executive order from Governor of New York Andrew Cuomo. The Nets reopened the Barclays Center to spectators on February 23.

The Nets clinched a playoff berth for the third straight year, following their victory over the Toronto Raptors on April 27, becoming the first Eastern Conference team, and second overall to do so.

The Nets faced the Boston Celtics in the First Round of the 2021 NBA playoffs, defeating them in five games. The Nets then faced the Milwaukee Bucks in the Conference Semifinals and lost the series in seven games.

Draft

The Nets entered the draft holding one first round pick and one second round pick. The first round pick was acquired on June 20, 2019, in a trade with the Los Angeles Clippers. The second round pick was acquired on July 13, 2018, in a trade with the Denver Nuggets. The Nets used their 19th overall pick to select Saddiq Bey, and then selected Jay Scrubb with the 55th overall pick.

Roster

Standings

Division

Conference

Game log

Preseason
The preseason schedule was announced on November 27, 2020.

|- style="background:#bfb;"
| 1
| December 13
| Washington
| 
| Irving (18)
| Jordan, Perry (7)
| Dinwiddie (7)
| Barclays CenterNo in-person attendance
| 1–0
|- style="background:#bfb;"
| 2
| December 18
| @ Boston
| 
| Durant (25)
| Allen (11)
| Irving, Jordan (5)
| TD GardenNo in-person attendance
| 2–0

Regular season
The regular season schedule for the first two games of the season was released on December 2, 2020, while the schedule for the first half of the season was released on December 4. The schedule for the second half of the season was released on February 24, 2021.

|- style="background:#bfb;"
| 1
| December 22
| Golden State
| 
| Irving (26)
| Jordan (11)
| LeVert (5)
| Barclays CenterNo in-person attendance
| 1–0
|- style="background:#bfb;"
| 2
| December 25
| @ Boston
| 
| Irving (37)
| Allen (11)
| Irving (8)
| TD GardenNo in-person attendance
| 2–0
|- style="background:#fbb;"
| 3
| December 27
| @ Charlotte
| 
| Durant (29)
| Allen (14)
| Irving (6)
| Spectrum CenterNo in-person attendance
| 2–1
|- style="background:#fbb;"
| 4
| December 28
| Memphis
| 
| LeVert (28)
| Allen (15)
| LeVert (11)
| Barclays CenterNo in-person attendance
| 2–2
|- style="background:#bfb;"
| 5
| December 30
| Atlanta
| 
| Durant (33)
| Allen (13)
| Durant, LeVert (8)
| Barclays CenterNo in-person attendance
| 3–2

|- style="background:#fbb;"
| 6
| January 1
| Atlanta
| 
| Durant (28)
| Irving (11)
| Durant, Irving (4)
| Barclays CenterNo in-person attendance
| 3–3
|- style="background:#fbb;"
| 7
| January 3
| Washington
| 
| Irving (30)
| Allen, Durant (11)
| Irving (10)
| Barclays CenterNo in-person attendance
| 3–4
|- style="background:#bfb;"
| 8
| January 5
| Utah
| 
| Irving (29)
| Allen (18)
| T. Johnson (7)
| Barclays CenterNo in-person attendance
| 4–4
|- style="background:#bfb;"
| 9
| January 7
| Philadelphia
| 
| Harris (28)
| Allen, Jordan (11)
| LeVert (10)
| Barclays CenterNo in-person attendance
| 5–4
|- style="background:#fbb;"
| 10
| January 8
| @ Memphis
| 
| LeVert (43)
| Green (9)
| Allen, LeVert (6)
| FedExForumNo in-person attendance
| 5–5
|- style="background:#fbb;"
| 11
| January 10
| Oklahoma City
| 
| Durant (36)
| Durant (11)
| LeVert (6)
| Barclays CenterNo in-person attendance
| 5–6
|- style="background:#bfb;"
| 12
| January 12
| Denver
| 
| Durant (34)
| Durant (9)
| Durant (13)
| Barclays CenterNo in-person attendance
| 6–6
|- style="background:#bfb;"
| 13
| January 13
| @ New York
| 
| Durant (26)
| Brown (14)
| Chiozza (7)
| Madison Square GardenNo in-person attendance
| 7–6
|- style="background:#bfb;"
| 14
| January 16
| Orlando
| 
| Durant (42)
| Harden (12)
| Harden (14)
| Barclays CenterNo in-person attendance
| 8–6
|- style="background:#bfb;"
| 15
| January 18
| Milwaukee
| 
| Harden (34)
| Jordan (12)
| Harden (12)
| Barclays CenterNo in-person attendance
| 9–6
|- style="background:#fbb;"
| 16
| January 20
| @ Cleveland
| 
| Durant (38)
| Durant (12)
| Harden (12)
| Rocket Mortgage FieldHouse1,944
| 9–7
|- style="background:#fbb;"
| 17
| January 22
| @ Cleveland
| 
| Irving (38)
| Harris (7)
| Harden (11)
| Rocket Mortgage FieldHouse1,944
| 9–8
|- style="background:#bfb;"
| 18
| January 23
| Miami
| 
| Durant (31)
| Jordan, Brown (8)
| Harden (11)
| Barclays CenterNo in-person attendance
| 10–8
|- style="background:#bfb;"
| 19
| January 25
| Miami
| 
| Durant, Harden (20)
| Durant (13)
| Harden (8)
| Barclays CenterNo in-person attendance
| 11–8
|- style="background:#bfb;"
| 20
| January 27
| @ Atlanta
| 
| Durant (32)
| Harden (8)
| Harden (15)
| State Farm Arena1,008
| 12–8
|- style="background:#bfb;"
| 21
| January 29
| @ Oklahoma City
| 
| Harden, Irving (25)
| Perry (11)
| Harden (11)
| Chesapeake Energy ArenaNo in-person attendance
| 13–8
|- style="background:#fbb;"
| 22
| January 31
| @ Washington
| 
| Durant (37)
| Brown (9)
| Irving (8)
| Capital One ArenaNo in-person attendance
| 13–9

|- style="background:#bfb;"
| 23
| February 2
| L.A. Clippers
| 
| Irving (39)
| Harden (11)
| Harden (14)
| Barclays CenterNo in-person attendance
| 14–9
|- style="background:#fbb;"
| 24
| February 5
| Toronto
| 
| Harris (19)
| Harden (7)
| Harden (12)
| Barclays CenterNo in-person attendance
| 14–10
|- style="background:#fbb;"
| 25
| February 6
| @ Philadelphia
| 
| Harden (26)
| Harden (8)
| Harden (10)
| Wells Fargo CenterNo in-person attendance
| 14–11
|- style="background:#fbb;"
| 26
| February 9
| @ Detroit
| 
| Irving (27)
| Brown (9)
| Harden (12)
| Little Caesars ArenaNo in-person attendance
| 14–12
|- style="background:#bfb;"
| 27
| February 10
| Indiana
| 
| Irving (35)
| Jordan (13)
| Irving (8)
| Barclays CenterNo in-person attendance
| 15–12
|- style="background:#bfb;"
| 28
| February 13
| @ Golden State
| 
| Irving (23)
| Harden (8)
| Harden (16)
| Chase CenterNo in-person attendance
| 16–12
|- style="background:#bfb;"
| 29
| February 15
| @ Sacramento
| 
| Irving (40)
| Harden (13)
| Harden (14)
| Golden 1 CenterNo in-person attendance
| 17–12
|- style="background:#bfb;"
| 30
| February 16
| @ Phoenix
| 
| Harden (38)
| Green (8)
| Harden (11)
| PHX Arena3,181
| 18–12
|- style="background:#bfb;"
| 31
| February 18
| @ L.A. Lakers
| 
| Harden (23)
| Jordan (8)
| Harden (11)
| Staples CenterNo in-person attendance
| 19–12
|- style="background:#bfb;"
| 32
| February 21
| @ L.A. Clippers
| 
| Harden (37)
| Harden, Jordan (11)
| Irving (8)
| Staples CenterNo in-person attendance
| 20–12
|- style="background:#bfb;"
| 33
| February 23
| Sacramento
| 
| Brown, Harden (29)
| Harden (11)
| Harden (14)
| Barclays Center324
| 21–12
|- style="background:#bfb;"
| 34
| February 25
| Orlando
| 
| Irving (27)
| Jordan (11)
| Irving (9)
| Barclays Center327
| 22–12
|- style="background:#fbb;"
| 35
| February 27
| Dallas
| 
| Harden (29)
| Brown (9)
| Harden (6)
| Barclays Center684
| 22–13

|- style="background:#bfb;"
| 36
| March 1
| @ San Antonio
| 
| Harden (30)
| Harden (14)
| Harden (15)
| AT&T CenterNo in-person attendance
| 23–13
|- style="background:#bfb;"
| 37
| March 3
| @ Houston
| 
| Harden (29)
| Harden, Jordan (10)
| Harden (14)
| Toyota Center3,615
| 24–13
|- style="background:#bfb;"
| 38
| March 11
| Boston
| 
| Irving (40)
| Harden (10)
| Harden (8)
| Barclays Center1,374
| 25–13
|- style="background:#bfb;"
| 39
| March 13
| Detroit
| 
| Harden (24)
| Harden (10)
| Harden (10)
| Barclays Center1,364
| 26–13
|- style="background:#bfb;"
| 40
| March 15
| New York
| 
| Irving (34)
| Harden (15)
| Harden (15)
| Barclays Center1,637
| 27–13
|- style="background:#bfb;"
| 41
| March 17
| @ Indiana
| 
| Harden (40)
| Harden (10)
| Harden (15)
| Bankers Life FieldhouseNo in-person attendance
| 28–13
|- style="background:#fbb;"
| 42
| March 19
| @ Orlando
| 
| Irving (43)
| Brown (7)
| Harden (9)
| Amway Center3,665
| 28–14
|- style="background:#bfb;"
| 43
| March 21
| Washington
| 
| Irving (28)
| Irving (7)
| Harden (8)
| Barclays Center1,773
| 29–14
|- style="background:#bfb;"
| 44
| March 23
| @ Portland
| 
| Harden (25)
| Jordan (10)
| Harden (17)
| Moda CenterNo in-person attendance
| 30–14
|- style="background:#fbb;"
| 45
| March 24
| @ Utah
| 
| A. Johnson (23)
| A. Johnson (15)
| Chiozza (11)
| Vivint Arena5,546
| 30–15
|- style="background:#bfb;"
| 46
| March 26
| @ Detroit
| 
| Harden (44)
| Harden (14)
| Harden (8)
| Little Caesars Arena750
| 31–15
|- style="background:#bfb;"
| 47
| March 29
| Minnesota
| 
| Harden (38)
| Harden (11)
| Harden (13)
| Barclays Center1,732
| 32–15
|- style="background:#bfb;"
| 48
| March 31
| Houston
| 
| Irving (31)
| Claxton, Harden (8)
| Irving (12)
| Barclays Center1,773
| 33–15

|- style="background:#bfb;"
| 49
| April 1
| Charlotte
| 
| Green (21)
| Irving (11)
| Irving (8)
| Barclays Center1,773
| 34–15
|- style="background:#fbb;"
| 50
| April 4
| @ Chicago
| 
| Irving (24)
| Griffin (8)
| Irving (15)
| United CenterNo in-person attendance
| 34–16
|- style="background:#bfb;"
| 51
| April 5
| New York
| 
| Irving (40)
| Harris (8)
| Irving (7)
| Barclays Center1,773
| 35–16
|- style="background:#bfb;"
| 52
| April 7
| New Orleans
| 
| Irving (24)
| Brown (8)
| Chiozza (8)
| Barclays Center1,773
| 36–16
|- style="background:#fbb;"
| 53
| April 10
| L.A. Lakers
| 
| Durant (22)
| Brown, Durant (7)
| Durant (5)
| Barclays Center1,773
| 36–17
|- style="background:#bbb;"
| —
| April 12
| @ Minnesota
| —
| colspan="3"|Postponed for security reasons due to Daunte Wright protests; moved to April 13
| Target Center
| —
|- style="background:#bfb;"
| 54
| April 13
| @ Minnesota
| 
| Durant (31)
| Brown (12)
| Chiozza, Shamet (5)
| Target CenterNo in-person attendance
| 37–17
|- style="background:#fbb;"
| 55
| April 14
| @ Philadelphia
| 
| Irving (37)
| Jordan (14)
| Irving (9)
| Wells Fargo Center4,094
| 37–18
|- style="background:#bfb;"
| 56
| April 16
| Charlotte
| 
| Harris (26)
| Claxton (9)
| Durant (11)
| Barclays Center1,773
| 38–18
|- style="background:#fbb;"
| 57
| April 18
| @ Miami
| 
| Shamet (30)
| Brown (11)
| Irving (9)
| American Airlines ArenaNo in-person attendance
| 38–19
|- style="background:#bfb;"
| 58
| April 20
| @ New Orleans
| 
| Irving (32)
| Brown (11)
| Irving, Shamet (8)
| Smoothie King Center3,700
| 39–19
|- style="background:#fbb;"
| 59
| April 21
| @ Toronto
| 
| Irving (28)
| Brown (14)
| Irving (8)
| Amalie ArenaNo in-person attendance
| 39–20
|- style="background:#bfb;"
| 60
| April 23
| Boston
| 
| Harris (20)
| Jordan (11)
| Irving (11)
| Barclays Center1,773
| 40–20
|- style="background:#bfb;"
| 61
| April 25
| Phoenix
| 
| Irving (34)
| Jordan (12)
| Irving (12)
| Barclays Center1,773
| 41–20
|- style="background:#bfb;"
| 62
| April 27
| @ Toronto
| 
| Green (22)
| Durant (10)
| James (8)
| Amalie ArenaNo in-person attendance
| 42–20
|- style="background:#bfb;"
| 63
| April 29
| @ Indiana
| 
| Durant (42)
| A. Johnson (21)
| Durant (10)
| Bankers Life FieldhouseNo in-person attendance
| 43–20
|- style="background:#fbb;"
| 64
| April 30
| Portland
| 
| Irving (28)
| A. Johnson (12)
| Griffin (4)
| Barclays Center1,773
| 43–21

|- style="background:#fbb;"
| 65
| May 2
| @ Milwaukee
| 
| Durant (42)
| Jordan (11)
| Irving (6)
| Fiserv Forum3,280
| 43–22
|- style="background:#fbb;"
| 66
| May 4
| @ Milwaukee
| 
| Irving (38)
| Durant, Jordan (9)
| Durant (6)
| Fiserv Forum3,280
| 43–23
|- style="background:#fbb;"
| 67
| May 6
| @ Dallas
| 
| Irving (45)
| Griffin (10)
| Irving, James (4)
| American Airlines Center4,602
| 43–24
|- style="background:#bfb;"
| 68
| May 8
| @ Denver
| 
| Durant (33)
| Durant (11)
| Durant (7)
| Ball Arena4,044
| 44–24
|- style="background:#bfb;"
| 69
| May 11
| @ Chicago
| 
| Durant (21)
| Brown, Claxton (10)
| Durant (8)
| United Center3,434
| 45–24
|- style="background:#bfb;"
| 70
| May 12
| San Antonio
| 
| Shamet (21)
| Brown (11)
| Harden (11)
| Barclays Center1,773
| 46–24
|- style="background:#bfb;"
| 71
| May 15
| Chicago
| 
| Irving (22)
| Brown (12)
| Harden (7)
| Barclays Center1,773
| 47–24
|- style="background:#bfb;"
| 72
| May 16
| Cleveland
| 
| Durant (23)
| Durant (8)
| Durant (13)
| Barclays Center1,773
| 48–24

Playoffs

|- style="background:#bfb;"
| 1
| May 22
| Boston
| 
| Durant (32)
| Durant (12)
| Harden (8)
| Barclays Center14,391
| 1–0
|- style="background:#bfb;"
| 2
| May 25
| Boston
| 
| Durant (26)
| Brown, Durant (8)
| Harden (7)
| Barclays Center14,774
| 2–0
|- style="background:#fbb;"
| 3
| May 28
| @ Boston
| 
| Harden (41)
| Durant (9)
| Harden (10)
| TD Garden4,789
| 2–1
|- style="background:#bfb;"
| 4
| May 30
| @ Boston
| 
| Durant (42)
| Irving (11)
| Harden (18)
| TD Garden17,226
| 3–1
|- style="background:#bfb;"
| 5
| June 1
| Boston
| 
| Harden (34)
| Harden (10)
| Harden (10)
| Barclays Center14,993
| 4–1

|- style="background:#bfb;"
| 1
| June 5
| Milwaukee
| 
| Durant (29)
| Griffin (14)
| Irving (8)
| Barclays Center15,750
| 1–0
|- style="background:#bfb;"
| 2
| June 7
| Milwaukee
| 
| Durant (32)
| Griffin (8)
| Durant, Irving (6)
| Barclays Center15,776
| 2–0
|- style="background:#fbb;"
| 3
| June 10
| @ Milwaukee
| 
| Durant (30)
| Brown, Durant (11)
| Durant (5)
| Fiserv Forum16,310
| 2–1
|- style="background:#fbb;"
| 4
| June 13
| @ Milwaukee
| 
| Durant (28)
| Durant (13)
| Durant (5)
| Fiserv Forum16,310
| 2–2
|- style="background:#bfb;"
| 5
| June 15
| Milwaukee
| 
| Durant (49)
| Durant (17)
| Durant (10)
| Barclays Center16,067
| 3–2
|- style="background:#fbb;"
| 6
| June 17
| @ Milwaukee
| 
| Durant (32)
| Durant (11)
| Harden (7)
| Fiserv Forum16,310
| 3–3
|- style="background:#fbb;"
| 7
| June 19
| Milwaukee
| 
| Durant (48)
| Griffin (11)
| Harden (9)
| Barclays Center16,287
| 3–4

Player statistics

Regular season statistics
As of May 16, 2021

|-
| style="text-align:left;"| || 5 || 5 || 26.0 || .521 || .800 || 1.000 || 4.8 || 2.6 || .6 || 2.2 || 12.8
|-
| style="text-align:left;"| || 12 || 5 || 26.7 || .677 ||  || .754 || 10.4 || 1.7 || .6 || 1.6 || 11.2
|-
| style="text-align:left;"| || 65 || 37 || 22.3 || .556 || .288 || .735 || 5.4 || 1.6 || .9 || .4 || 8.8
|-
| style="text-align:left;"| || 22 || 1 || 10.5 || .352 || .310 || .765 || 1.1 || 3.0 || .3 || .3 || 4.0
|-
| style="text-align:left;"| || 32 || 1 || 18.6 || .621 || .200 || .484 || 5.2 || .9 || .7 || 1.3 || 6.6
|-
| style="text-align:left;"| || 4 || 0 || 4.3 || .333 ||  ||  || .5 || .5 || .0 || .0 || .5
|-
| style="text-align:left;"| || 3 || 3 || 21.3 || .375 || .286 || 1.000 || 4.3 || 3.0 || .7 || .3 || 6.7
|-
| style="text-align:left;"| || 35 || 32 || 33.1 || .537 || .450 || .882 || 7.1 || 5.6 || .7 || 1.3 || 26.9
|-
| style="text-align:left;"| || 68 || 38 || 27.0 || .492 || .412 || .776 || 3.9 || 1.6 || .5 || .4 || 11.0
|-
| style="text-align:left;"| || 26 || 10 || 21.5 || .492 || .383 || .782 || 4.7 || 2.4 || .7 || .5 || 10.0
|-
| style="text-align:left;"| || 36 || 35 || 36.6 || .471 || .366 || .856 || 8.5 || 10.9 || 1.3 || .8 || 24.6
|-
| style="text-align:left;"| || 69 || 65 || 31.0 || .505 || .475 || .778 || 3.6 || 1.9 || .7 || .2 || 14.1
|-
| style="text-align:left;"| || 54 || 54 || 34.9 || .506 || .402 || .922 || 4.8 || 6.0 || 1.4 || .7 || 26.9
|-
| style="text-align:left;"| || 13 || 1 || 18.2 || .370 || .355 || .778 || 2.5 || 4.2 || .5 || .1 || 7.7
|-
| style="text-align:left;"| || 18 || 0 || 10.5 || .588 || .167 || 1.000 || 5.0 || .8 || .3 || .3 || 5.2
|-
| style="text-align:left;"| || 39 || 3 || 17.5 || .393 || .364 || .857 || 2.0 || 1.2 || .4 || .0 || 5.4
|-
| style="text-align:left;"| || 57 || 43 || 21.9 || .763 || .000 || .500 || 7.5 || 1.6 || .3 || 1.1 || 7.5
|-
| style="text-align:left;"| || 5 || 0 || 3.2 || .333 || .500 ||  || .6 || .4 || .0 || .0 || .6
|-
| style="text-align:left;"| || 12 || 4 || 27.8 || .435 || .349 || .765 || 4.3 || 6.0 || 1.1 || .5 || 18.5
|-
| style="text-align:left;"| || 58 || 7 || 18.1 || .365 || .314 || .814 || 2.2 || 1.2 || .6 || .1 || 6.4
|-
| style="text-align:left;"| || 3 || 0 || 9.3 || .426 ||  ||  || 2.3 || .0 || .0 || 1.0 || 2.0
|-
| style="text-align:left;"| || 26 || 0 || 8.1 || .410 || .190 || .769 || 2.8 || .5 || .2 || .2 || 3.0
|-
| style="text-align:left;"| || 12 || 4 || 18.2 || .405 || .351 || .889 || 2.8 || .6 || .7 || .7 || 8.1
|-
| style="text-align:left;"| || 5 || 0 || 12.6 || .143 || .125 || .500 || 3.0 || .8 || .6 || .2 || 1.2
|-
| style="text-align:left;"| || 61 || 12 || 23.0 || .408 || .387 || .846 || 1.8 || 1.6 || .5 || .2 || 9.3
|-
| style="text-align:left;"| || 2 || 0 || 5.5 || .250 || .000 ||  || .5 || .0 || .5 || .0 || 1.0
|-
| style="text-align:left;"| || 4 || 0 || 2.8 || .000 || .000 ||  || .3 || .3 || .0 || .0 || .0

Playoff statistics
As of June 19, 2021

|-
| style="text-align:left;"| || 12 || 5 || 23.1 || .506 || .182 || .813 || 5.1 || 2.1 || .7 || .4 || 7.9
|-
| style="text-align:left;"| || 6 || 0 || 3.2 || .286 || .333 ||  || .2 || .2 || .2 || .0 || .8
|-
| style="text-align:left;"| || 12 || 0 || 10.8 || .483 ||  || .667 || 2.8 || .6 || .3 || 1.0 || 2.5
|-
| style="text-align:left;"| || 12 || 12 || 40.4 || .514 || .402 || .871 || 9.3 || 4.4 || 1.5 || 1.6 || 34.3
|-
| style="text-align:left;"| || 6 || 1 || 24.7 || .485 || .556 || .875 || 2.8 || 1.7 || .5 || .3 || 8.2
|-
| style="text-align:left;"| || 12 || 12 || 26.5 || .532 || .389 || .714 || 5.9 || 1.8 || .8 || .5 || 9.0
|-
| style="text-align:left;"| || 9 || 9 || 35.8 || .472 || .364 || .903 || 6.3 || 8.6 || 1.7 || .7 || 20.2
|-
| style="text-align:left;"| || 12 || 12 || 36.2 || .398 || .402 || .750 || 3.6 || 1.6 || .3 || .2 || 11.2
|-
| style="text-align:left;"| || 9 || 9 || 36.1 || .472 || .369 || .929 || 5.8 || 3.4 || 1.0 || .6 || 22.7
|-
| style="text-align:left;"| || 9 || 0 || 11.4 || .326 || .313 ||  || 1.8 || 1.3 || .2 || .0 || 3.7
|-
| style="text-align:left;"| || 5 || 0 || 4.6 || .571 ||  ||  || 2.6 || .0 || .6 || .0 || 1.6
|-
| style="text-align:left;"| || 8 || 0 || 8.6 || .353 || .273 || 1.000 || .8 || .6 || .3 || .0 || 2.1
|-
| style="text-align:left;"| || 7 || 0 || 3.6 || .300 || .333 ||  || .4 || .3 || .0 || .0 || 1.1
|-
| style="text-align:left;"| || 5 || 0 || 4.4 || .538 || .400 ||  || 1.2 || .2 || .2 || .0 || 3.2
|-
| style="text-align:left;"| || 12 || 0 || 17.2 || .439 || .385 || .800 || 1.8 || .6 || .4 || .1 || 4.2

Transactions

Trades

Additions

Subtractions

References

External links
 2020–21 Brooklyn Nets at Basketball-Reference.com

Brooklyn Nets season
Brooklyn Nets seasons
Brooklyn Nets
Brooklyn Nets
2020s in Brooklyn
Events in Brooklyn, New York
Prospect Heights, Brooklyn